Phyllonorycter ruwenzori is a moth   of the family Gracillariidae. It is found in the Ruwenzori Range in Uganda in mountainous forests at altitudes above 1,000 meters.

The length of the forewings is 2.3–2.5 mm. The forewing is elongate and the ground colour is ochreous brown with white markings. The hindwings are light fuscous. Adults are on wing in late August and early September.

Etymology
The species is named after the Ruwenzori Range, its known area of occurrence.

References

Endemic fauna of Uganda
Moths described in 2012
ruwenzori
Insects of Uganda
Moths of Africa

Taxa named by Jurate de Prins